Charles Lukwago (born 24 November 1992) is a Ugandan professional footballer who plays as a goalkeeper for Ethiopian Premier League club Saint George and the Uganda national team.

Club career
In summer 2021, Lukwago signed for Ethiopian Premier League club Saint George on a two-year contract.

References

External links

1992 births
Living people
Ugandan footballers
People from Buikwe District
Association football goalkeepers
Proline FC players
SC Victoria University players
Lweza FC players
Kampala Capital City Authority FC players
Saint George S.C. players
Uganda international footballers
Ugandan expatriate footballers
Ugandan expatriate sportspeople in Ethiopia
Expatriate footballers in Ethiopia
Ethiopian Premier League players
Uganda A' international footballers
2020 African Nations Championship players